The 2012 World Figure Skating Championships was an international figure skating competition in the 2011–12 season. The event determined the World Champions in men's singles, ladies' singles, pair skating, and ice dancing. It was held between March 26 and April 1 in Nice, France.

Host
In November 2009, the International Skating Union named Nice, France as the provisional host. In early 2011, it was announced that Montpellier was also under consideration; however, in May 2011, Nice's Palais des Expositions was confirmed as the event venue. The nearby Jean Bouin Center was the practice rink. The cost was estimated at USD $10 million. The competition rink, practice rink, and athletes' accommodation facilities are within 60 yards of each other, with an efficient transportation system also boosting Nice's bid.

The event determined the number of entries a country could send to the 2013 World Championships.

Qualification
The event was open to figure skaters from ISU member nations who reached the age of 15 by July 1, 2011. Based on the results of the 2011 World Championships, each country was allowed between one and three entries per discipline. National associations selected their entries based on their own criteria but those skaters had to achieve a minimum technical elements score (TES) at an international event prior to the World Championships. The minimum TES for each discipline and segment were:

Countries which qualified more than one entry per discipline:

Entries
Member nations submitted the following entries:

Some skaters were required to compete in a preliminary round, while others received a direct entry into the short program, after which the number of entries was reduced further. If a country had a non-direct entry, its lowest-ranked skater according to the Worlds Standings competed in the preliminary round.

Kiira Korpi was originally nominated to represent Finland, but announced her withdrawal on March 16, 2012 due to lingering foot and hip injuries. Alisa Mikonsaari was chosen to take her place in the competition.

Schedule
Nice time (UTC+02:00):

 Monday, March 26
 14:30–16:45 – Preliminary round: Pairs
 17:15–21:15 – Preliminary round: Dance
 Tuesday, March 27
 10:30–16:00 – Preliminary round: Ladies
 17:00–22:15 – Preliminary round: Men
 Wednesday, March 28
 13:00–16:20 – Pairs' short
 18:40–22:30 – Short dance
 Thursday, March 29
 12:30–16:55 – Ladies' short
 19:00–22:20 – Free dance
 Friday, March 30
 12:30–16:55 – Men's short
 19:30–22:25 – Pairs' free
 Saturday, March 31
 12:55–17:00 – Men's free
 18:30–22:25 – Ladies' free
 Sunday, April 1
 14:15–16:45 – Exhibitions

Overview

27 skaters competed in the men's preliminary round and the top twelve – led by Song Nan, Sergei Voronov, and Maciej Cieplucha – advanced to the short program. Patrick Chan, Michal Březina, and Daisuke Takahashi were the top three skaters in the short program.

The men's free skating was held the next evening. Chan won his second World title, Takahashi won silver, and Yuzuru Hanyu won the bronze medal in his senior World debut. Chan was the first men's single skater to win consecutive World titles since Stéphane Lambiel of Switzerland. The event was the first time Japan had two men on the World podium.

33 skaters competed in the ladies' preliminary round and the top twelve – led by Jenna McCorkell, Jelena Glebova, and Sonia Lafuente – advanced to the short program. The top three skaters in the short program were Alena Leonova, Kanako Murakami, and Carolina Kostner.

Kostner was first in the free skating, followed by Akiko Suzuki and Ashley Wagner. Kostner became Italy's first ladies' World champion, silver medalist Leonova was the first Russian to reach the ladies' World podium since 2005, and Suzuki won the bronze. Kostner was the first European lady since 2005 (Irina Slutskaya) to win the gold medal at Worlds. Kostner said: "It is my tenth season at senior level, and in each season I've learned something. Today was my day and my competition. I would have been happy with second place, but I thought ‘keep on dreaming to the end’."

Eleven couples competed in the pairs' preliminary round and the top eight – led by Sui Wenjing / Han Cong, Vanessa James / Morgan Cipres, and Mari Vartmann / Aaron Van Cleave – advanced to the short program. Russian pairs Yuko Kavaguti / Alexander Smirnov and Vera Bazarova / Yuri Larionov collided during their first practice session on March 26 but were not injured.

Aliona Savchenko / Robin Szolkowy took the lead in the short program, followed by Pang Qing / Tong Jian and Narumi Takahashi / Mervin Tran. After falls on previous competition attempts, Savchenko/Szolkowy landed the rare throw triple Axel (first successfully executed in international competition by Rena Inoue / John Baldwin at the 2006 Winter Olympics) for the first time in their career but her free foot touched the ice. Some skaters expressed concerns about the ice quality. Maxim Trankov said: "It is soft in some places, brittle in others. I guess it is ok if you skate right after ice resurfacing, but if you are the last one to skate in the second group, it is quite another story." Alexander Smirnov said: "Sometimes it simply crushes under your blades like glass."

Volosozhar / Trankov placed first in the free skating, Savchenko / Szolkowy were second and Takahashi / Tran were third. Savchenko / Szolkowy won their fourth World title – becoming the fifth pair in the post-World War II period to do so – Volosozhar / Trankov repeated as silver medalists, and Takahashi / Tran won bronze – the first ever World pairs medal for Japan.

23 couples competed in the ice dancing preliminary round and the top ten – led by Elena Ilinykh / Nikita Katsalapov, Huang Xintong / Zheng Xun, and Irina Shtork / Taavi Rand – advanced to the short dance. Viktor Kovalenko – who qualified with his partner Anna Nagornyuk in 9th place – received his visa on the morning of March 26 and arrived at the arena ten minutes before they were due to compete in the preliminary round. Gregory Merriman's blade broke off his heel a minute before the end of the performance but he and his partner, Danielle O'Brien, were also able to qualify.

Tessa Virtue / Scott Moir took the lead in the short dance, followed by Meryl Davis / Charlie White and Nathalie Pechalat / Fabian Bourzat. The top three were the same in the free dance. Virtue / Moir won their second World title, while the 2011 World Champions, Davis / White, took silver, and Pechalat / Bourzat won bronze, their first World medal for overall placement.

Results

Men

Ladies

Pairs

Ice dancing

Medals summary

Medalists
Medals for overall placement:

Small medals for placement in the short segment:

Small medals for placement in the free segment:

Medals by country
Table of medals for overall placement:

Table of small medals for placement in the short segment:

Table of small medals for placement in the free segment:

References

External links

 Starting orders and results at the International Skating Union
 Official website of Nice 2012
 Entries and schedule

World Figure Skating Championships, 2012
World Figure Skating Championships
World Figure Skating Championships
International figure skating competitions hosted by France